In market research, frugging is "fund-raising under the guise of research". This behavior occurs when a product marketer falsely purports to be a market researcher conducting a statistical survey, when in reality the "researcher" is attempting to solicit a donation.

Generally considered unethical, this tactic is strictly prohibited by trade groups, such as CASRO and the Marketing Research Association, for their member research companies.

References

See also
 Push poll
 Sugging

Ethically disputed business practices
Market research